The Seven Lakes is a group of lakes which belong to the same drainage basin that starts in the Lácar Lake and ends in Corral Bay.

All the seven lakes are located at least partly within the Panguipulli commune that promotes tourism in the area. The area is surrounded by four volcanoes; Villarrica, Quetrupillán, Lanín and Mocho-Choshuenco. Due to geothermal activity there are several hot springs in the zone, including Liquiñe.

The seven lakes are:

Panguipulli Lake
Calafquén Lake
Riñihue Lake
Pirihueico Lake
Neltume Lake 
Pellaifa Lake 
Pullinque Lake

References

Landforms of Los Ríos Region
Glacial lakes of Chile
Tourism in Chile
Lakes of Chile